Philip Bayard "Phil" Crosby, (June 18, 1926 – August 18, 2001) was a businessman and author who contributed to management theory and quality management practices.

Crosby initiated the Zero Defects program at the Martin Company.  As the quality control manager of the Pershing missile program, Crosby was credited with a 25 percent reduction in the overall rejection rate and a 30 percent reduction in scrap costs.

Early life and career
Crosby was born in Wheeling, West Virginia, in 1926. He served in the Navy during World War II and again during the Korean War. In between, he earned a degree from the Ohio College of Podiatric Medicine.

His first job in the field of quality was that of test technician in the quality department at Crosley Corporation in Richmond, Indiana, beginning in 1952. He left for a better-paying position as reliability engineer at Bendix Corporation in Mishawaka, Indiana in 1955, working on the RIM-8 Talos missile. He left after less than two years to become senior quality engineer at The Martin Company's new Orlando, Florida organization to develop the Pershing missile. There he developed the Zero Defects concept.  He eventually rose to become department head before leaving for ITT Corporation in 1965 to become director of quality.

In 1979, Crosby started the management consulting company Philip Crosby Associates, Inc. This consulting group provided educational courses in quality management both at their headquarters in Winter Park, Florida, and at eight foreign locations.

Quality is Free
Also in 1979, Crosby published his first business book, Quality Is Free, sub-titled The Art of Making Quality Certain. This book would become popular at the time because of the crisis in North American quality. During the late 1970s and into the 1980s, North American manufacturers were losing market share to Japanese products largely due to the superior quality of the Japanese goods.

Crosby's response to the quality crisis was the principle of  "doing it right the first time" (DIRFT). He also included four major principles:
The definition of quality is conformance to requirements (requirements meaning both the product and the customer's requirements)
The system of quality is prevention
The performance standard is zero defects (relative to requirements)
The measurement of quality is the price of nonconformance

His belief was that an organization that establishes good quality management principles will see savings returns that more than pay for the cost of the quality system: "quality is free". It is less expensive to do it right the first time than to pay for rework and repairs.

Works

References

External links

1926 births
2001 deaths
American business theorists
20th-century American businesspeople
United States Navy personnel of World War II
United States Navy personnel of the Korean War
Writers from Wheeling, West Virginia
Military personnel from West Virginia
Quality experts
United States Navy sailors
Businesspeople from Wheeling, West Virginia
Bendix Corporation people